Flumexadol (INN) (developmental code name CERM-1841 or 1841-CERM) is a drug described and researched as a non-opioid analgesic which was never marketed. It has been found to act as an agonist of the serotonin 5-HT1A (pKi = 7.1) and 5-HT2C (pKi = 7.5) receptors and, to a much lesser extent, of the 5-HT2A (pKi = 6.0) receptor. According to Nilsson (2006) in a paper on 5-HT2C receptor agonists as potential anorectics, "The (+)-enantiomer of this compound showed [...] affinity for the 5-HT2C receptor (Ki) 25 nM) [...] and was 40-fold selective over the 5-HT2A receptor in receptor binding studies. Curiously, the racemic version [...], also known as 1841 CERM, was originally reported to possess analgesic properties while no association with 5-HT2C receptor activity was mentioned." It is implied that flumexadol might be employable as an anorectic in addition to analgesic. Though flumexadol itself has never been approved for medical use, oxaflozane (brand name Conflictan) is a prodrug of the compound that was formerly used clinically in France as an antidepressant and anxiolytic agent.

Synthesis

Ex 1: Halogenation of 2-chloro ethyl vinyl ether [110-75-8] (1) with molecular bromine gives 1,2-dibromo-1-(2-chloroethoxy)ethane [14689-94-2] (2). Grignard reaction with 3-bromobenzotrifluoride [401-78-5] (3) gives 1-[2-Bromo-1-(2-chloroethoxy)ethyl]-3-(trifluoromethyl)benzene, CID:12343529 (4).

Ex 4: Treatment with benzylamine gives 4-benzyl-2-[3-(trifluoromethyl) phenyl]morpholine, CID:213531 (5).

Ex 6: Catalytric hydrogenation strips the benzyl protecting group completing the synthesis of flumexadol (6).

See also
Oxaflozane
 Befiradol
 Fenfluramine
 Fludorex
 Fluminorex
 TFMPP

References

5-HT1A agonists
5-HT2A agonists
5-HT2C agonists
Analgesics
Anorectics
Antidepressants
Anxiolytics
Phenylmorpholines
Trifluoromethyl compounds